Brandon Darrnell Williams (born October 12, 1987) is a former American football tight end. He was signed by the Carolina Panthers as an undrafted free agent in 2012 out of the University of Oregon. He played basketball at Portland Bible College and won a Conference Championship in 2013 season.

Professional career

Carolina Panthers
In 2012, after his basketball career at Portland Bible College, Williams entered the NFL Draft. After going undrafted, he worked out for several teams and gained interest. He eventually signed with the Carolina Panthers in 2013. 

On September 26, 2015, Williams was waived by the Panthers.

Miami Dolphins
On September 30, 2015, Williams was signed to the Miami Dolphins' practice squad. On December 5, 2015, Williams was waived. On December 8, 2015, he was signed to the active roster. On December 14, 2015, he was placed on injured reserve.

Seattle Seahawks
On April 28, 2016, Williams was signed by the Seattle Seahawks. He played in all 16 games and playoffs. He was an extremely tough blocker and a key special teams player. He also started in The Seahawks last playoff games vs the Atlanta Falcons.

Indianapolis Colts
On March 20, 2017, Williams signed with the Indianapolis Colts. On September 3, 2017, he was released by the Colts, but was re-signed the next day after Erik Swoope was placed on injured reserve.

On September 17, 2017, in Week 2, Williams had his first reception as a member of the Colts, a 20-yard catch from quarterback Jacoby Brissett, in the 16–13 overtime loss to the Arizona Cardinals. In Week 15, Williams was hospitalized after suffering a serious head injury on a punt play. He was diagnosed with a concussion and was placed on injured reserve on December 22, 2017.

References

External links 
 Seattle Seahawks bio
 Miami Dolphins bio
 Carolina Panthers bio
 Oregon Ducks bio

1987 births
Living people
American football tight ends
Oregon Ducks football players
Carolina Panthers players
Miami Dolphins players
Seattle Seahawks players
Indianapolis Colts players